Parchment paper, or vegetable parchment, is a cellulose-based composite that has been processed to give it additional properties like non-stickiness, grease resistance, and resistance to humidity. It is commonly used in baking as a disposable non-stick, grease resistant surface.  It should not be confused with  waxed paper, which is paper that has been coated in wax.

Parchmentization of paper
Vegetable parchment paper is made by running sheets of paper pulp through a bath of sulfuric acid (a method similar to the way tracing paper is made) or sometimes zinc chloride. This process partially dissolves or gelatinizes the paper. This treatment forms a sulfurized cross-linked material, with high density, stability, heat resistance, grease resistance, water resistance, no loose fibers as well as low surface energy — thereby imparting good non-stick or release properties. The treated paper has an appearance similar to that of parchment and, because of its strength, is sometimes used in legal documents for which parchment was traditionally used. (However, parchment paper is manufactured with acid, and has a low pH, making it inappropriate for archival documents where acid-free paper is the better choice.)

Applications in cooking and baking

A common use is to eliminate the need to grease sheet pans and the like, allowing very rapid turn-around of batches of baked goods with minimal clean up. Parchment paper is also used to cook en papillote, a technique where food is steamed or cooked within closed pouches made from parchment paper.

Parchment paper can be used in most applications that call for wax paper as a non-stick surface. The reverse is not true, as using wax paper would cause smoke in the oven and would adversely affect flavor.

Other bakery release papers
The non-stick properties can be also achieved by employing a coated paper, for which a suitable release agent—a coating with a low surface energy and capability to withstand the temperatures involved in the baking or roasting process—is deposited onto the paper's surface; silicone (cured with a suitable catalyst) is frequently used.

Other applications
Parchment paper also has relevant properties for other industries. In the textile tube industry, an outer layer of parchment confers the necessary resistance to abrasion, heat and oil. In other industries, parchment is used as a processing aid due to its release properties, whether for furniture laminate manufacturing and rubber vulcanization.

Disposal
Parchment paper is composed of cellulosic fibers and therefore is considered compostable both in an industrial setting (EN13432) and at home.

See also
 Coated paper
 Dough
 Greaseproof paper
 Release liner

References

Baking
Paper
Food preparation utensils
Coated paper